Caroga costalis is the only species in the  monotypic moth genus Caroga of the family Erebidae. It is found in Rio de Janeiro, Brazil. Both the genus and the species were first described by Schaus in 1906.

References

Calpinae
Moths described in 1906